Mazzucco is an Italian surname. Notable people with the surname include:

Alexandra Mazzucco (born 1993), German handball player
Joe Mazzucco (1891–?), Italian racing driver
Massimo Mazzucco (born 1954), Italian film director
Melania Mazzucco (born 1966), Italian author
Raphael Mazzucco, Canadian photographer
Alberto Mazzucco (born 1911), Italian ex-football player

See also
Mazzucco Sanctuary, a religious sanctuary in Piedmont, Italy

Italian-language surnames